Sandwich is a 2011 Indian Malayalam comedy film directed by debutant director M. S. Manu, starring Kunchacko Boban, Richa Panai and Ananya in the lead roles. The movie was released on 14 October 2011 to negative response.

Plot
Sai, a high-profile software engineer who is currently acknowledged as the best in their payrolls of his big MNC. Betrothed to another techie Shruthy, Sai and his friends lead a happy-go lucky life. After a small party on a Friday, Sai rushes home to join his parents for dinner, but on the way happens to hit another car, killing the driver. Very soon Sai realizes that he has actually killed a dreaded criminal of the city who was the main accused in many police cases. The goon's younger brother Murugan now starts to follow Sai in the belief that he is one of the men of their enemy Andipetty Naykkar and has knowingly killed his brother. Naykkar, on the other hand warmly welcomes Sai and starts protecting him and even offers to marry him to his only daughter. Sandwiched between two goons and two girls, Sai plans to escape from the difficult situation is the rest of the story.

Cast
 Kunchacko Boban as Sai
 Ananya as Kanmani
 Richa Panai as Shruthi
 Lalu Alex as Ramachandran, Sai's father
 Suraj Venjaramood as Andipetti Nayiker
 Vijayakumar as Murugan
 Indrans as Brusli Sasi
 P. Sreekumar as Bhadran, Shruthi's father 
 Shari as Sreedevi, Sai's mother
 Biju Pappan as Mani 
 Poojappura Ravi as Advocate Purushothaman
 Subi Suresh as Seema, Ammini Kumar's wife
 Kottayam Nazeer as Ammini Kumar
 Valsala Menon as Sai's grandmother 
 Kulappully Leela as Murugan's mother

Production
Kunchacko Boban appears in the lead of this debut film by M S Manu, who was an associate to director Shaji Kailas. The film has Richa Panai (of Bhima Jewellery advertisement) as the heroine, along with Ananya.

References

External links 
 

2010s Malayalam-language films
2011 films
Indian romantic comedy films
2011 romantic comedy films